Mol or MOL may refer to:

Arts and entertainment
 D mol, a Montenegrin vocal group
 Mol (TV series), a 2015 Pakistani television drama series
 M.O.L. (video), a 2002 video album by American rock band Disturbed

Businesses and organizations
 MOL (company), a Hungarian oil and gas company
 MOL Trucks, a Belgian truck manufacturer
 Mitsui O.S.K. Lines, a Japanese international shipper

Language
 Mol language, also Amol, Alatil, or Aru, a Torricelli language of Papua New Guinea
 mol, ISO 639-3 and ISO 639-2 code for Moldovan language

People
 Mol (surname), Dutch surname (including people named "de Mol", "Mols" and "van Mol")
 Michael O'Leary (businessman), CEO of Ryanair

Places
 Mol, Belgium, a municipality in Belgium
 Mol (Ada), a town in Serbia
 City Municipality of Ljubljana
 Molde Airport, Årø in Norway (IATA code MOL)
 Moldova, UNDP country code

Science and technology

Computing
 , the file extension of the MDL Molfile chemical file format
 MOL-360, a systems programming language
 Method of lines, a mathematical method

Other uses in science and technology
 mol, symbol for the SI base mole (unit)
 Manned Orbiting Laboratory, a project of the United States Air Force's manned spaceflight program
 Method of levels, a method in psychotherapy
 Method of lines, a technique for solving partial differential equations

Other uses
 Metropolitan Open Land, a category of protected land in London, UK
 Member of the Order of Liberty
 MOL, vehicle registration code for Märkisch-Oderland, Germany

See also

 Mohl, a surname
 Mole (disambiguation)
 Moll (disambiguation)
 Van Mol, a surname
 MØL, a Danish band
 
 molar mass (the mass of a mole)